Ahsen Rafiq "Ace" Bhatti (born 13 September 1969) is a British actor who trained at the London Academy of Music and Dramatic Art. He has appeared in numerous television series, including Cardiac Arrest, Holding On, NCS: Manhunt, New Street Law, Life Isn't All Ha Ha Hee Hee, The Sarah Jane Adventures and EastEnders and The Good Karma Hospital.

Career
Bhatti began acting at age fourteen starring in the children series Dramarama, however it wasn't until the nineties until he furthered his career, for which he appeared in the British soap opera Family Pride, Band of Gold, Holding On, and most notably as Dr Rajesh Rajah in Cardiac Arrest, among many other television roles during this time. In 2002, Bhatti made a brief appearance in Bend It Like Beckham, played the central character Dave in BBC Three's dark comedy Grease Monkeys (2003), and played flashy Ash Aslan in 2006's New Street Law. In 2007, he took on a minor role for two episodes in the first series of Secret Diary of a Call Girl as Ashok, a regular client of the main character, Belle. He reappeared in 2010 in the same role. In 2008, Bhatti appeared as a supporting character in the second series of The Sarah Jane Adventures, and reprised his role for the third series in 2009, the fourth series in 2010 and in the fifth series in 2011. Although credited in his early career by his birth name Ahsen Bhatti, Bhatti changed his professional name to Ace Bhatti (Ace is a childhood nickname). In 2011, he played Commander Khokar in the BBC2 series The Shadow Line.

In April 2013, Bhatti became a patron of Theatre Royal Wakefield. In 2018, he played Freddie Mercury's father Bomi Bulsara in the biopic Bohemian Rhapsody.

EastEnders
In 2010, Bhatti was cast as Yusef Khan, the father of already established character Afia Masood (Meryl Fernandes). Bhatti was already known to EastEnders executive producer Bryan Kirkwood when he auditioned for the part, as Kirkwood and Bhatti worked on Coronation Street at the same time. Bhatti was the only actor who auditioned for the part of Yusef. In fact, Wadia recommended Bhatti to Kirkwood to play Yusef, as she "thought that he definitely had the quality that Yusef would need—which is a very ambiguous but charming quality!" Bhatti explained to Digital Spy that the EastEnders cast are very welcoming. He explained: "They're so welcoming. There's a lot of joking about. I'm having a great time at EastEnders - it's a real privilege to be here. I've known Nitin and Nina Wadia, who plays Zainab, for a very long time and we've always got on very well. Nitin and I play tense scenes together so it's nice that we can have a laugh afterwards." He featured in a domestic violence storyline in late 2011 with co-star Nina Wadia who plays Yusef's wife Zainab. Yusef starts to abuse Zainab both physically and mentally. He forbids Zainab to leave the house and later starts using her son, Kamil, to control her. Wadia explains that she wants the storyline to have a positive impact against real-life violence. She told BBC News: "I think the idea behind showing a strong woman like Zainab changing like this is to show that it can happen to even the strongest of women. They can change and they can be manipulated - especially if they're isolated from their friends and family. The manipulator can take advantage, so it's to prove that it can even happen to people like her. To be honest, if even one woman rings that Action Line at the end of the show and there's some difference made to her life, I'll feel like we've done our job," she continued. "It is a serious issue and I'm glad it's being highlighted. I hope that it wakes anyone up - not just women, I know that there are abused men out there as well. So if it gives anyone the strength to leave a relationship like that, we'll have done our job." The scenes where Yusef refused to let Zainab see Kamil pulled in 8.69m viewers at 7.30pm. BBC Three's repeat of the episode later secured 994k viewers at 10pm.

Selected filmography

Film

Television

References

External links
 
 Ace Bhatti Interview with Asiana Mag
 Ace Bhatti Interview with LeftLion Magazine

1969 births
British male film actors
British male television actors
British male voice actors
British male actors of Indian descent
British male actors of South Asian descent
Living people
Actors from Nottingham
Male actors from Nottinghamshire
Actors from Whitby